Bánh gối (Vietnamese: Pillow bánh), also known as Bánh xếp, Bánh quai vạc, is a Vietnamese regional dumpling. The dish is a common street food in Vietnam.

The main structure  of bánh gối is commonly seasoned ground meat, mushrooms, vermicelli, and diced vegetables such as carrots, kohlrabi and jicama (like ingredients of chả giò); sometimes used boiled egg and slice Chinese sausage. It wrapped into a thinly rolled piece of dough and deep-fried. For pastries, filling of bánh gối has mung bean, sugar and curettage coconut.

History
Believed to be inspired by the British Cornish pasty or Spanish empanadas and pastel. Portuguese traders and explorers were the first Europeans to enter Asia in the 1500s, building settlements to test the lucrative spice trade in Goa, India, Malacca and Macau. This process has indirectly influenced the cuisine of Asian countries. For a long time, pasty has become a snack throughout Asia. Bánh gối originally from Guangdong yaugok and deef-fried jiaozi was introduced to Vietnam before 1954.

References 

Dumplings
Bánh
Street food in Vietnam